Revolution Renaissance was a multinational power metal band founded by guitarist Timo Tolkki after he left Stratovarius in 2008. The band released three studio albums before disbanding in 2010.

History

New Era
The studio lineup for the New Era album was Michael Kiske, Tobias Sammet and Pasi Rantanen on vocals, Pasi Heikkilä on bass, Joonas Puolakka on keyboards, and Mirka Rantanen on drums. Tolkki himself is the only one included in the permanent lineup, which was announced later.

Age of Aquarius
In March 2009, the band released their second album Age of Aquarius with a permanent lineup when Gus Monsanto joined the band as the new lead singer. The band said that it was "by far the darkest, heaviest and most symphonic album that Tolkki has ever been involved in.". In October 2009 Timo Tokki announced that both Justin Biggs and Mike Khalilov have left the band due to musical differences.

On 1 November 2009 Blabbermouth.net reported that Magnus Rosén (former bass player for HammerFall) joined Revolution Renaissance.

Trinity and breakup
In an interview with the Finnish news website kp24 published on 10 May, Timo Tolkki announced that Greek Firewind and Outloud keyboarder Bob Katsionis was the new keyboard player of the band and that they were currently mixing their third and final album, Trinity, which was released in fall.

On 28 July Tolkki announced the break-up of Revolution Renaissance. He commented by saying:

"Due to my private problems, the lack of interest in Revolution Renaissance, shown by the promoters, and the current situation in the music industry that affects to everything including the production budgets, it has become impossible to continue the band. We have tried to book shows in these last three years, but we haven't been able to do so. A rock band cannot exist without direct contact to its fans. Therefore I have no other choice but to make the decision to stop the band and its activities due to the above-mentioned reasons. The third and final album of the band will be released at the end of September. From the bottom of my heart I would like to thank all the fans of my music throughout the years. It's been a great journey."

The third Revolution Renaissance album, titled Trinity, was released later in the year through Napalm Records.

Band members

Last line-up
Timo Tolkki - guitar (2008–2010)
Gus Monsanto - vocals (2008–2010)
Bruno Agra - drums (2008–2010)
Magnus Rosén - bass (2009–2010)
Bob Katsionis - keyboards (2010)

Former members
Mike Khalilov - keyboards (2008–2009)
Justin Biggs - bass (2008–2009)

Session members
Michael Kiske - vocals
Tobias Sammet - vocals
Pasi Rantanen - vocals
Pasi Heikkilä - bass
Joonas Puolakka - keyboards
Mirka Rantanen - drums
Magdalena Lee - vocals Tears Of Magdalena
Iva Gluhak - vocals

Discography

Studio albums
 New Era (2008)
 Age of Aquarius (2009)
 Trinity (2010)

Demos
 Untitled Demo (2008)

Notes and references

External links 
 

Finnish power metal musical groups
Musical groups established in 2008
Musical groups disestablished in 2010
Napalm Records artists
Scarlet Records artists